Tugtupite is a beryllium aluminium tectosilicate. It also contains sodium and chlorine and has the formula Na4AlBeSi4O12Cl. Tugtupite is a member of the silica-deficient feldspathoid mineral group. It occurs in high alkali intrusive igneous rocks.

Tugtupite is tenebrescent, sharing much of its crystal structure with sodalite, and the two minerals are occasionally found together in the same sample.

Tugtupite occurs as vitreous, transparent to translucent masses of tetragonal crystals and is commonly found in white, pink, to crimson, and even blue and green. It has a Mohs hardness of 4 and a specific gravity of 2.36.  It fluoresces crimson under ultraviolet radiation.

It was first found in 1962 at Tugtup agtakôrfia Ilimaussaq intrusive complex of southwest Greenland. It has also been found at Mont-Saint-Hilaire in Quebec and in the Lovozero Massif of the Kola Peninsula in Russia

The name is derived from the Greenlandic Inuit word for reindeer (tuttu), and means "reindeer blood."

The U.S. Geological Survey reports that in Nepal, tugtupite (as well as jasper and nephrite) were found extensively in most of the rivers from the Bardia to the Dang.

It is used as a gemstone.

References

Sodium minerals
Beryllium minerals
Aluminium minerals
Feldspathoid
Sodalite group
Natural history of Greenland
Tetragonal minerals
Minerals in space group 82
Gemstones